Arthur Holden (born August 28, 1959) is a Canadian actor and writer. Known for his roles such as Mr. Ratburn in Arthur, Baba-Miao in Sagwa, the Chinese Siamese Cat, Mayor Mallard in The Little Twins, and Mr. Larkin in later episodes of What's With Andy?, he has also had roles in film, television and theatre, and has written for stage, film and television. Ars Poetica is a play that Holden wrote.

Holden has also done voices for many video games such as Tom Clancy's Rainbow Six: Vegas, Far Cry Instincts, Hype: The Time Quest,  Prince of Persia: Warrior Within, and Deus Ex: Human Revolution.

Early life
Holden's father was politician Richard Holden (1931–2005). His mother, Hélène Papachristidis Holden, is a Montreal novelist and recipient of the Order of Canada.

Career
Holden appears in movies such as The Bone Collector, The Sum of All Fears, Million Dollar Babies, The Hound of the Baskervilles, When Justice Fails, The Greatest Game Ever Played and The Aviator. He voiced the characters of David Miller in the 2005 computer game Still Life and Sibrand in the 2007 game Assassin's Creed. He also appeared on Are You Afraid of the Dark? in its third-season episode, "The Tale of the Midnight Ride" as Ichabod Crane's Ghost. His other appearance in that series was Mr. Brooks the science teacher in fifth-season episode "The Tale of the Dead Man's Float" and as the Court Jester in sixth-season episode "The Tale of the Wisdom Glass".

He also guest starred in TV shows including Soldier of Fortune, Inc., The Hunger and The Business.

Personal life
Holden currently lives in Montreal with his wife Claire Holden Rothman.

Filmography

Film
 Remembering Mel (1984) –
 Wild Thing (1987) – Manager of Gat Bar
 The Treasure of Swamp Castle (1988) – Captain
 God Bless the Child (1988) –
 Day One (1989) – Scientist (uncredited)
 The Scorpo Factor (1989) – Hugo
 Fatman and Little Boy (1989) – Oakridge Doctor
 Money (1991) – 4th Broker
 La sarrasine (1992) – Le secrétaire
 The Postmistress (1992) – Interprete
 David Copperfield (1993) – Duke Wickfield
 Mrs. Parker and the Vicious Circle (1994) – Ward
 La vie d'un héros (1994) – Chauffeur d'Hanibal
 Hiroshima (1995) – Map Room Officer
 Hawk's Vengeance (1996) – Dr. Sattler
 How the Toys Saved Christmas (1996) – Train driver (voice, English dub)
 In the Presence of Mine Enemies (1997) – David
 The Minion (1998) – Forensics Officer
 Twist of Fate (1998) – Attorney
 When Justice Fails (1999) – Coroner's Man
 Quand je serai parti... vous vivrez encore (1999) – Greffier
 The Patty Duke Show: Still Rockin' in Brooklyn Heights (1999) – Sam
 Bonanno: A Godfather's Story (1999) – Simon
 The Bone Collector (1999) – Bookstore Clerk
 Isn't She Great (2000) – Bookstore Clerk (uncredited)
 Where the Money Is (2000) – Bob
 Heavy Metal 2000 (2000) – Dr. Schechter (voice)
 Two Thousand and None (2000) – Phillip Carlilo
 Lion of Oz (2000) – Additional voices
 The Hound of the Baskervilles (2000) Mr. John Barrymore
 Canada: A People's History (2000) – William Cormack
 Arthur's Perfect Christmas (2000) – Nigel Ratburn (voice)
 The Warden (2001) – Karaoke Man
 The Killing Yard (2001) – Dr. John Edland
 The Royal Scandal (2001) – Sigismund
 Abandon (2002) – Frank Peabody
 The Struggle (2002) – Adolf Eichmann
 The Sum of All Fears (2002) – Dressler's Associate
 Gleason (2002) – Maitre D'
 Is the Crown at War with Us? (2002) – Narrator
 Rudy: The Rudy Giuliani Story (2003) – Reporter #1
 Bad Apple (2004) – Home Depot Clerk
 Noel (2004) – Piano Player
 Eternal (2004) –
 Head in the Clouds (2004) – Arnold Beck
 Arthur's Halloween (2004) – Nigel Ratburn (voice)
 The Aviator (2004) – Radio Announcer
 Slow Burn (2005) – Felix Lang
 The Greatest Game Ever Played (2005) – Club Secretary
 300 (2006) – Partisan
 Blind Trust (2007) – Mr. Orick
 The Great War (2007) – Col. John McCrae
 I'm Not There (2007) – Townsfolk #2
 Dr. Jekyll and Mr. Hyde (2008) – Fowler
 Moomin and Midsummer Madness (2008) – Snufkin (voice, English dub)
 The True History of Puss 'N Boots (2009) – The Chamberlain (voice, English dub)
 Desiderata (2009) – Pharmacist
 Whiteout (2009) – McGuire
 Barney's Version (2010) – Notary
 Moomins and the Comet Chase (2010) – Snork (voice, English dub)
 Everywhere (2010) – Man #2
 Trader Games (2010) – Fox
 File Under Miscellaneous (2010) – Doctor
 Assassin's Creed: Ascendance (2010) – Octavien de Valois (voice)
 Mirror Mirror (2012) – Noble #1
 Kaspar (2012) – Background Voice (voice)
 On the Road (2012) – Maitre D
 Pinocchio (2012) – Policeman #1, The Owl, Town Crier (voice English dub)
 Attack of the Brainsucker (2012) – Dr. Leonard
 Sorry, Rabbi (2012) – Rabbi
 The Girl in the Rubber Mask (2012) – The Man
 Warm Bodies (2013) – Zombie Patient
 Hold My Breath (2013) – Taxi Man
 Rouge Sang (2013) – Le Blessé
 Nicky Deuce (2013) – Driver
 The Storm Within (2013)
 Rhymes for Young Ghouls (2013) – Priest #1
 JFK: The Smoking Gun (2013) – Dr. John Ebersole
 Meetings with a Young Poet (2014) – Jerome
 X-Men: Days of Future Past (2014) – Blue Suit Traveler
 An Eye for Beauty (2014) – Professeur de Vancouver
 Pawn Sacrifice (2014) – Party Guest #3
 Holder's Comma (2014) – Man
 The Forbidden Room (2015) – Auctioneer
 Stonewall (2015) – Frank Kameny
 Northpole: Open for Christmas (2015) – Blizzby
 Race (2016) – Rudolf Dassler, Announcer
 Meat (2016) – Doctor
 Quantico (2016) – Doctor
 Final Destiny (2016) – FBI Agent
 Bad Santa 2 (2016) – Buttslap Santa
 Hidden (2016) – Truiit
 Sahara (2017) Sergeant, Maurice (voices, English dub)
 Mother! (2017) – Lingerer
 A Yeti Adventure (2017) – Edward Martineau (voice, English dub)
 Arthur and the Haunted Tree House (2017) – Nigel Ratburn (voice)
 Another Kind of Wedding (2017) – John
 D.W. and the Beastly Birthday (2017) – Nigel Ratburn (voice)
 Lemonade (2018) – Doctor
 On the Basis of Sex (2018) – Dr. Leadbetter
 Long Shot (2019) – Royal Crier
 Moment (2019) – Douglas
 My Salinger Year (2020) – Dean
 Within These Walls (2020) – Pest controller
 Felix and the Treasure of Morgäa (Félix et le trésor de Morgäa) - 2021: Klaus

Television
 The Littl' Bits (1980) – Snagglebit (voice)
 Maya the Bee (1980) – Alexander
 Samurai Pizza Cats (1990) – Various characters (voice)
 The Little Flying Bears (1990) – Walt (voice)
 Saban's Adventures of the Little Mermaid (1991) – Ridley (voice)
 A Bunch of Munsch (1992) – Additional voices
 The Adventures of Grady Greenspace (1992–1993) – Musical Rat #3 (voice)
 Sirens (1994) – Priest
 Million Dollar Babies (1994) – Poppa Dionne
 Are You Afraid of the Dark? (1994–1999) – Court Jester, Mr. Brooks, Ichabod Crane
 The Busy World of Richard Scarry (1995–1996) – Bump the Cave Pig (voice)
 Les aventures de la courte échelle (1996) – Mr Smith
 Arthur (1996–2022) – Nigel Ratburn, Bionic Bunny (voices)
 Jungle Show (1997) – Ronny the Rhino, Kenny the Jaguar, Elvis the Elephant (voices)
 The Country Mouse and the City Mouse Adventures (1997–1998) – Additional voices                                                
 Carrot Top (1997) - Raoul
 The Hunger (1997–1999) – Robertson, Motel Bellman
 The Mystery Files of Shelby Woo (1998) – David Vandermeer
 Soldier of Fortune, Inc. (1998) – Dr. Randolph Fredricks, Uniformed Inspector
 The Animal Train (1998) – Dad (voice)
 Bouscotte (1998) – Comptable
 Mona the Vampire (1999) – Murray Karpowitz (voice)
 Tommy & Oscar (1999) – Additional voices
 War of 1812 (1999) – Tiger Dunlop
 Misguided Angels (1999) – Sneezing Angel
 Rotten Ralph (1999–2001) – Additional voices
 A Miss Mallard Mystery (2000) – Additional voices
 Jim Knopf (2000–2001) – Additional voices
 Sagwa, the Chinese Siamese Cat (2001–2002) – Baba Wim Bao Miao, Baba Miao (voices)
 X-DuckX (2001–2005) – Additional voices
 Seriously Weird (2002) – Rajkowski
 The Last Chapter (2002) – Prosecutor
 Daft Planet (2002) – Frederick Stiles (voice)
 Mystery Ink (2003) – True Crimes Performer
 Kid Paddle (2003) – Mr. Paddle (voice)
 Ratz (2003) – Benny (voice)
 Mental Block (2003–2004) – Mr. Haddock
 What's with Andy? (2003–2007) – Dad (voice)
 Fortier (2004) – Toutoune Rochon
 Postcards from Buster (2004) – Nigel Ratburn (voice)
 Fries with That (2004) – Head Office Guy
 Tripping the Rift (2004–2007) – Additional voices
 Air Emergency (2005) – Voice over commentary
 Mr. Meaty (2005–2009) – Additional voice
 The Business (2006) – Rabbi Diamond
 René Lévesque (2006) George Marler
 Rumours (2006) – Interviewer
 Martin Morning (2006) – Additional voice (English dub)
 Indian Summer: The Oka Crisis (2006) – Alex Paterson
 Bethune (2006) – Andrei Ganit
 St. Urbain's Horseman (2007) – Critic
 Killer Wave (2007) – Reporter Brand
 Sophie (2008) – Official
 Being Human (2011) – Brinck
 O''' (2012) – Barman
 Gawayn (2012) – Additional voice
 A Stranger in My Home (2013) – Albert Hajny
 14 Tagebücher des Ersten Weltkriegs (2014) – Pireaud
 The Lottery (2014) – Pharmacist
 Mohawk Girls (2014) – Sommelier
 Helix (2015) – Dr. Pozniak
 19-2 (2015) – Electrocuted Ma
 Jonathan Strange & Mr Norrell (2015) – Corpse 2
 The Fixer (2015) – McCann
 Natural Born Outlaws (2015) – Tommy Butler
 H2O: Mermaid Adventures (2015) – Rikki's Dad
 The Art of More (2015–2016) – Auctioneer
 Real Detective (2016) – Rusk
 Béliveau (2017) – Commentateur match anglais, Dr. Lévesque
 Fatal Vows (2017) – Mr. Quast
 The Truth About the Harry Quebert Affair (2017) – Dr. Ashcroft
 The Detectives (2018) – Robert Keppel
 Deadly Secrets (2019) – Ashley
 En tout cas (2019) – Homme hôpital
 My Worst Nightmare (2019) – Dark Ma
 Street Legal (2019) – Unfamiliar Lawyer
 District 31 (2019) – Dr. William Faber
 Transplant (2020) – Announcement voice

Video games
 Hype: The Time Quest (1999) – Additional voices
 Evolution Worlds (2002) – Eugene Leopold, Campa, Infantryman #3
 Splinter Cell (2002) – President Bowers
 S2: Silent Storm (2003) – Additional voices
 Rainbow Six 3: Black Arrow (2004) – Additional voices
 Prince of Persia: Warrior Within (2004) – Additional voices
 Memorick: The Apprentice Knight (2004) – Additional voices
 Still Life (2005) – David Miller, Mark Ackerman, The Crow Man
 Far Cry Instincts (2005) – Additional voices
 Rainbow Six: Vegas (2006) – Additional voices
 Naruto: Rise of a Ninja (2007) – Additional voices
 Assassin's Creed (2007) – Sibrand
 Assassin's Creed II (2009) – Emilio Barbarigo
 Assassin's Creed: Brotherhood (2010) – Octavien de Valois
 Deus Ex: Human Revolution (2011) – Hugh Darrow
 Assassin's Creed: Revelations (2011) – Byzantine Guards
 Assassin's Creed III: Liberation (2012) – Gilbert Antoine de Saint-Maxent, Spanish Guardsman
 Deus Ex: Human Revolution - Director's Cut (2013) – Hugh Darrow
 Deus Ex: Mankind Divided (2016) – Safe Harbour Convention Attendee
 For Honor (2017) – Knight Warden
 Assassin's Creed: Origins (2017) – Phanos, Trireme Drummer
 Tom Clancy's Ghost Recon Breakpoint (2019) – Dr. Gregory Ballard

Writer
 Father Land Out of Control Simon in the Land of Chalk Drawings Potatoes and Dragons Sharky and George Bob in a Bottle Three Little Ghosts Lucky Luke The Book of Bob Ars Poetica Battered''

References

External links 
 

1959 births
Living people
Anglophone Quebec people
Canadian male television actors
Canadian male film actors
Canadian male voice actors
Canadian male stage actors
Canadian television writers
Canadian male television writers
21st-century Canadian dramatists and playwrights
Canadian male screenwriters
Male actors from Montreal
Writers from Montreal
Canadian male dramatists and playwrights
21st-century Canadian male writers
20th-century Canadian male actors
21st-century Canadian male actors
Canadian voice directors
21st-century Canadian screenwriters
Arthur (TV series)